Mendel Medal may refer to:

 Mendel Medal (genetics), an award granted by The Genetics Society, a UK learned society
 , an award for achievement in science by scientists of religious conviction
 Mendel Medal (Germany), awarded by the German National Academy of Sciences Leopoldina